The Islamic World Educational, Scientific and Cultural Organization (ICESCO, formerly ISESCO) is a specialized organization that operates under the aegis of the Organization of Islamic Cooperation (OIC), and is concerned with fields of education, science, culture and communication in Islamic countries in order to support and strengthen relations among Member States. The Organization's headquarters is located in Rabat, Morocco, and its Director General is Dr. Salim M. Almalik.

ICESCO was founded by the Organisation of Islamic Cooperation (OIC) in May 1979. With 54 member states, the working languages of ICESCO are Arabic, English and French.

Overview 
On Wednesday 30 January 2020, the 40th session of the Executive Council of the Islamic Educational, Scientific and Cultural Organization, held in Abu Dhabi, State of the United Arab Emirates, adopted the modification of the name of the Organization into "Islamic World Educational, Scientific and Cultural Organization" (ICESCO). In this regard, Dr. Salim M. Almalik, ICESCO Director General, stated that the modification of the name of the Organization aims to clarify the nature of its missions, and open wide prospects for its presence at the international level. The Director General also highlighted that the new name accurately reflects the nature of the civilizational mission of ICESCO in the fields of education, science, culture and communication, as well as its purposes and objectives.

ICESCO's objectives are "to strengthen and promote cooperation among the Member States in the fields of education, science, culture and communication; consolidate understanding among peoples inside and outside Member State; contribute to world peace and security through various means; publicize the true image of Islam and Islamic culture; promote dialogue among civilizations, cultures and religions; encourage cultural interaction and foster cultural diversity in the Member States, while preserving cultural identity and intellectual integrity."

Presentation organs 
ICESCO includes three organizations:

 The General Conference – is held once every three years. 
 The Executive Council – consists of representative for each Member State, being versed in education, science, culture or communication
 The General Directorate – is headed by a Director General. The General Conference elects the Director for a three-year term.

Member states 
The Charter of Islamic World Educational, Scientific and Cultural Organization (ICESCO), stipulates that every full Member State of the Organization of Islamic Cooperation (OIC) shall become a member of ICESCO upon officially signing the Charter, and having completed the membership legal and legislative formalities and informed, in writing, the General Directorate of ICESCO. A State which is not a full member, or is an observer member of OIC, cannot become member of ICESCO.

ICESCO consists of fifty-four Member States, along with three Observer States, out of the fifty-seven Member States of the Organization of Islamic Cooperation – OIC. ICESCO Member States are listed below according to their Arabic alphabetical order.

The acronym ICESCO is formed from the initials of the Organization's name: IslamiC World Educational, Scientific and Cultural Organization.

References

External links
Official ICESCO website
Official OIC website 

International cultural organizations
International economic organizations
International educational organizations
International scientific organizations
Islamic organizations based in Morocco
Organizations based in Rabat
Organisation of Islamic Cooperation specialized agencies
International organizations based in Morocco